Anti-sabotage Joint Committee, or Komiteh Moshtarak, was built in the 1930s. It has been used by all Iranian regimes against political opponents.
It reportedly was shut down by the Islamic Republic in August 2000. Currently it is Ebrat  Museum ("Edification Museum") of Tehran, putting abuses under Mohammad Reza Pahlavi under display.

See also 

Evin Prison

References

External links

Roozbeh Farahanipour's report on Towhid Prison (archive.org)
Torture, Detention, and the Crushing of Dissent in Iran from Human Rights Watch

History of Tehran
Buildings and structures in Tehran
Prisons in Iran
Human rights abuses in Iran
Museums in Tehran
Prison museums in Asia